Sybistroma obscurellum is a species of fly in the family Dolichopodidae. It is found in the  Palearctic. The specific epithet obscurellum is also sometimes spelled as obscurella or obscurellus, depending on what grammatical gender the genus Sybistroma is interpreted to have.

References

External links
Images representing Sybistroma obscurellus  at BOLD

Dolichopodinae
Insects described in 1823
Asilomorph flies of Europe
Taxa named by Carl Fredrik Fallén